Sidemia is a genus of moths of the family Noctuidae.

Species
 Sidemia beduina Wiltshire, 1948
 Sidemia bremeri (Ershov, 1870)
 Sidemia dimorpha Rungs, 1950
 Sidemia judaica (Staudinger, 1897)
 Sidemia plebeja (Staudinger, 1888)
 Sidemia spilogramma (Rambur, 1871)
 Sidemia spodopterodes Hampson, 1908

References
Natural History Museum Lepidoptera genus database
Sidemia at funet

Hadeninae